The 2017 Women's Premier Hockey League was the second edition of South Africa's national league. The tournament was held in Johannesburg at the Randburg Astro. The tournament started on 25 November and culminated on 12 December 2017.

The Orange River Rafters won the tournament for the first time, defeating the St. Lucia Lakers 3–2 in a penalty shoot-out after the final finished as a 0–0 draw.

Competition format

Format
The 2017 Premier Hockey League followed a single round-robin format, followed by a classification round.

During the pool stage teams played each other once. The top four ranked teams qualified for the Classification Round. Team 1 played Team 4, while Team 2 played Team 3 in the two semi-finals. The two victorious teams moved onto the Final, while the losing teams competed for third place.

Point allocation
Match points will be distributed as follows:

 4 points: win by 3+ goals
 3 points: win and shoot-out win
 1 point: shoot-out loss
 0 points: loss

Participating teams
The following teams competed for the title:

  Blyde River Bunters
  Madikwe Rangers
  Namaqualand Daisies
  Orange River Rafters
  St. Lucia Lakers
  Wineland Wings

Results

Pool stage

Fixtures

Classification round

Semi-finals

Third and fourth place

Final

Awards

Statistics

Final standings

Goalscorers

References

External links
South African Hockey Association
PHL Women at the South African Hockey Association

Premier Hockey League (South Africa)
Premier Hockey League (South Africa)